Action Jackson is a 2014 Indian Hindi-language action thriller film directed by Prabhu Deva and produced by Gordhan P. Tanwani and Sunil Lulla. The film features Ajay Devgn in a double role, alongside Sonakshi Sinha, Yami Gautam and Manasvi Mamgai, while Kunaal Roy Kapur appears in a supporting role with Anandaraj playing the main antagonist. Deva and Devgn have paired for the first time with this film. Action Jackson released on 5 December 2014.

Plot
Vishi is a small-time crook who would do anything for money. He falls in love with Khushi, a simple HR executive, who then begins a relationship with him. One day, Vishi, who frequently gets involved in fights, publicly beats up a street gangster, who later seeks a revenge attack with his gang. The gangster and his gang brutally beat up Vishi, and easily escape the scene. It is then revealed that the person they had beaten is actually Vishi's lookalike, Jai. The goons escape when the police arrive, and Vishi is found alive on a bike, then the same goons get beaten brutally by Vishi. Khushi tries to explain to Vishi that she loves him; he understands, and they both start dating. On another occasion, ACP Shirke, arrests Jai and hands him over to a group of gangsters led by Pedro. Jai single-handedly kills them all and is revealed to be a professional assassin and previous right-hand man of underworld criminal Xavier Fonseca, nicknamed AJ. After AJ single-handedly rescued Xavier's sister Marina from a bunch of kidnappers, Marina falls for Jai, but he rejects her as he is married to Anusha.

Angered, Xavier tries to kill Anusha twice to get AJ married to Marina, which leaves her brutally injured. Jai escapes to India and is in the process of getting her treated. When Vishi spots Jai, he reveals his identity and story to Vishi. Jai then asks Vishi to go to Bangkok disguised as AJ to fool Xavier and Marina; meanwhile, AJ makes time to get Anusha operated on, as she is expecting a baby. Vishi agrees to help and goes to Bangkok along with his friend Musa. Meanwhile, Shirke finds AJ's lookalike and tries to inform Xavier, but he is murdered in a style that triggers suspicion in Xavier's mind. Marina, upon realizing the situation, tortures Musa to know the truth. He reveals that Vishi is the one who masqueraded as AJ. Xavier hatches a plan to bring AJ to Bangkok by kidnapping his wife, baby, and lookalike and threatens to kill all three of them. It is revealed up to that Vishi is actually in Mumbai, and AJ and himself switched their places in the airport at a time after the job is done. AJ reaches the spot and kills all of Xavier's henchmen. In a fight with Marina, AJ smashes her against the furnace and Marina is burned alive. After killing Xavier, he runs away with Anusha and the child. Later the child is revealed to be safe, rescued by one of Xavier's henchmen, Robert (Razzak Khan). The film ends with AJ, and Vishi meeting at the airport, and Anusha requests Vishi to marry Khushi soon.

Cast
Ajay Devgan as Jai aka AJ/Vishi (dual role)
Sonakshi Sinha as Khushi, Vishi's love interest.
Yami Gautam as Anusha, Jai aka AJ's wife.
Kunaal Roy Kapur as Moosa
Manasvi Mamgai as Marina Fonseca, Xavier's sister.
Anandaraj as Xavier Fonseca, AJ's boss and the head of a major crime syndicate, Marina's brother.
Jeetu Verma as Chotu
Razzak Khan as Robert, Xavier's henchman.
Arti Puri as Khushi's friend
Ankita Bhargava as Khushi's friend
Puru Raaj Kumar as ACP Shirke
Shawar Ali in a cameo appearance as Nawab
Rocky Verma as Riya's friend's father in New Zealand.
Ketan Karande as Pedro
Sulabha Arya as Vishi's neighbour
Nalneesh Neel as Panwala
Purva Parag as Khushi's mother
Rajesh Khattar as Special appearance
Prabhas in a guest appearance in the song "Punjabi Mast"
Shahid Kapoor in a special appearance in the song "Punjabi Mast"
Prabhu Deva in a special appearance in the song "AJ Theme"

Reception
Prarthna Sarkar from International Business Times gave Action Jackson 3 star out of 5, stating it is a "bad dream" for viewers. Gayatri Sarkar from Zee News gave 1 star out of 5, stating that the film failed to entertain the audience. Deepanjana Paul from Firstpost praised the font used for the credits saying it was legible. Film critic Rajeev Masand rated the film 3 out of 5, feeling that the film has excessive action. Under a headline calling the film a feminist milestone, Raja Sen for Rediff rated it 3/5, saying that while the film is filled with "relentless absurdity", the women propel the narrative in a refreshing way. Rachit Gupta from Filmfare gave a similar rating of 3/5, stating that the genre mixing of unscripted comedy and stylized action is " too inconsistent to garner any appreciation". Mumbai Mirror similarly rated it 3/5 and responded positively.

Music

Personnel

 Suhas Parab – producer
 Subhash Parab – producer
 Priyesh Vakil – producer
 Vivek Verma – producer
 Salman Shaikh – engineer
 Sakar Apte – engineer
 Anudutt Shamain – engineer
 Salman Shaikh – mastering
 Vivek Verma – Guitar

The soundtrack was composed by Himesh Reshammiya, while the lyrics were written by Shabbir Ahmed and Sameer. The introduction of "Gangster Baby" is from "Adiyae Kolluthe" from Vaaranam Aayiram.

Track listing

References

External links
 
 
 
 

2014 films
2010s Hindi-language films
2014 action thriller films
Hindi-language action films
Indian martial arts films
Indian action thriller films
Indian films about revenge
2014 masala films
Gun fu films
Indian pregnancy films
Films shot in Austria
Films directed by Prabhu Deva
Films scored by Himesh Reshammiya
2014 martial arts films